William Alexander Guerry (July 7, 1861 – June 9, 1928) was an American prelate who served as the eighth Bishop of South Carolina.

Early life and education
Guerry was born on July 7, 1861 in Clarendon County, South Carolina, the son of the Reverend LeGrand Felder Guerry and Margaret Serena Brailsford. He studied at Sewanee: The University of the South where he earned his Bachelor of Arts in 1884, his Master of Arts in 1884, and his Bachelor of Divinity in 1891.

Ordained Ministry
Guerry was ordained deacon on September 23, 1888, and priest on December 22, 1889 by Bishop Ellison Capers. In 1888, he was appointed rector of St John's Church in Florence, South Carolina, while in 1893 became chaplain of the University of the South, where he was also professor of homiletic and pastoral theology at the School of Theology. He was also involved in the construction of All Saints' Chapel in the university campus.

Bishop
In 1907, Guerry was elected Coadjutor Bishop of South Carolina, and was consecrated on September 15, 1907 by Presiding Bishop Daniel S. Tuttle. He then became the eighth diocesan bishop of the Diocese of South Carolina on April 22, 1908. Guerry was made a Mason at Sight and was a member of Landmark Lodge No 76, A.F.M. During his episcopacy, he worked to gain racial equality in the diocese.

Murder
On June 5, 1928, Guerry was shot in his office in St Philip's Church, Charleston, South Carolina by J. H. Woodward, a retired priest who had attacked his position on advancing racial equality in South Carolina. Great opposition was also elicited by the bishop's proposal to have a black suffragan bishop. Woodward committed suicide after shooting Guerry, who died four days later in Roper Hospital.

See also

 List of Succession of Bishops for the Episcopal Church, USA

References

External links
Bibliographic directory from Project Canterbury
Biography
Truth in Cold Blood, play about Guerry

1861 births
1928 deaths
19th-century Anglican theologians
20th-century Anglican theologians
Assassinated religious leaders
Episcopal bishops of South Carolina